The China Syndrome is a 1979 American disaster thriller film directed by James Bridges and written by Bridges, Mike Gray, and T. S. Cook. The film stars Jane Fonda, Jack Lemmon, Michael Douglas (who also produced), Scott Brady, James Hampton, Peter Donat, Richard Herd, and Wilford Brimley. It follows a television reporter and her cameraman who discover safety coverups at a nuclear power plant. "China syndrome" is a fanciful term that describes a fictional result of a nuclear meltdown, where reactor components melt through their containment structures and into the underlying earth, "all the way to China".

The China Syndrome premiered at the 1979 Cannes Film Festival, where it competed for the Palme d'Or while Lemmon received the Best Actor Prize. It was theatrically released on March 16, 1979, twelve days before the Three Mile Island nuclear accident in Dauphin County, Pennsylvania, which gave the film's subject matter an unexpected prescience. It became a critical and commercial success. Reviewers praised the film's screenplay, direction, and performances (most notably of Fonda and Lemmon), while it grossed $51.7 million on a production budget of $5.9 million. The film received four nominations at the 52nd Academy Awards; Best Actor (for Lemmon), Best Actress (for Fonda), Best Original Screenplay, and Best Production Design.

Plot
While visiting the (fictional) Ventana nuclear power plant outside Los Angeles, television news reporter Kimberly Wells, her cameraman Richard Adams and their soundman Hector Salas witness the plant going through a turbine trip and corresponding SCRAM (emergency shutdown). Shift Supervisor Jack Godell notices an unusual vibration in his cup of coffee.

In response to a gauge indicating high water levels, Godell begins removing water from the core, but the gauge remains high as operators open more valves to dump water. Another operator notices a second gauge indicating low water levels. Godell taps the first gauge, which immediately unsticks and drops to indicate very low levels. The crew urgently pumps water back in and celebrates in relief at bringing the reactor back under control.

Adams has surreptitiously filmed the incident, despite being asked not to film for security reasons. Wells' superior refuses her report of what happened. Adams steals the footage and shows it to experts who conclude that the plant came perilously close to meltdown – the China syndrome.

During an inspection of the plant before it is brought back online, Godell discovers a puddle of radioactive water that has apparently leaked from a pump. He pushes to delay restarting the plant, but the plant superintendent wants nothing standing in the way of the restart.

Godell finds that a series of radiographs supposedly verifying the welds on the leaking pump are identical – the contractor simply kept resubmitting the same picture. He brings the evidence to the plant manager, who brushes him off as paranoid, stating that new radiographs would cost $20 million. Godell confronts Royce, an employee of Foster-Sullivan who built the plant, as it was he who signed off on the radiographs. Godell threatens to go to the Nuclear Regulatory Commission, but Royce threatens him; later, a pair of men from Foster-Sullivan park outside his house.

Wells and Adams confront Godell at his home and he voices his concerns. Wells and Adams ask him to testify at the NRC hearings over Foster-Sullivan's plans to build another nuclear plant. Godell agrees to obtain, through Salas, the false radiographs to take to the hearings.

Salas' car is run off the road and the radiographs are taken from him. Godell is chased by the men waiting outside his home. He takes refuge inside the plant, where he finds that the reactor is being brought up to full power. Grabbing a gun from a security guard, he forces everyone out, including his friend and co-worker Ted Spindler, and demands to be interviewed by Wells on live television. Plant management agrees to the interview in order to buy time as they try to regain control of the plant.

Minutes into the broadcast, plant technicians deliberately cause a SCRAM so they can distract Godell and retake the control room. A SWAT team forces its way in, the television cable is cut, and Godell is shot. Before dying, he feels the unusual vibration again. The resulting SCRAM is brought under control only by the plant's automatic systems, and the plant suffers significant damage as the pump malfunctions.

Plant officials try to paint Godell as emotionally disturbed, but are contradicted by a distraught Spindler on live television saying Godell was not crazy and would never have taken such drastic steps had there not been something wrong. A tearful Wells concludes her report and the news cuts to a commercial for microwave ovens.

Cast

Reception
Roger Ebert reviewed it as:

Movie Reviews UK noted the film is:

The acting is also credited:

John Simon said The China Syndrome was a taut, intelligent, and chillingly gripping thriller till it turns melodramatic at its end. He called the ending both false and bathetic.

The film has a rating of 88% on Rotten Tomatoes based on reviews from 40 critics. The critical consensus reads: "With gripping themes and a stellar cast, The China Syndrome is the rare thriller that's as thought-provoking as it is tense". On Metacritic it has a score of 81 based on reviews from 16 critics, indicating "universal acclaim".

Box office
The film opened in 534 theatres in the United States and grossed $4,354,854 in its opening weekend.

Response of nuclear industry
The March 1979 release was met with backlash from the nuclear power industry's claims of it being "sheer fiction" and a "character assassination of an entire industry". Twelve days later, the Three Mile Island nuclear accident occurred in Dauphin County, Pennsylvania. While some credit the accident's timing in helping to sell tickets, the studio attempted to avoid appearing as if they were exploiting the accident, which included pulling the film from some theaters.

Accolades

See also
 Chernobyl (miniseries)
 Nuclear and radiation accidents and incidents

Explanatory notes

References

External links
 
 
 
 

1979 films
1970s disaster films
1970s thriller drama films
American disaster films
American thriller drama films
Anti-nuclear films
Columbia Pictures films
Films about journalists
Films about television
Films about whistleblowing
Films directed by James Bridges
Films produced by Michael Douglas
Films set in California
Films shot in Los Angeles
Three Mile Island accident
Films about nuclear accidents and incidents
1979 drama films
1970s English-language films
1970s American films
Films without soundtracks